SRA may refer to:

 SRA0 to SRA4, standard paper sizes defined by ISO 217
 Satanic ritual abuse
 SRa or SRA, a type of semiregular variable star
 Senior Airman (SrA), a US Air Force rank
 Septic Reserve Area, for a septic drain field
 The National Center for Biotechnology Information's Sequence Read Archive (previously Short Read Archive)
 Serotonin releasing agent, a type of drug
 Serotonin-release assay, a test for platelet-activating antibodies
 SRA-shooting, Sovellettu reserviläisammunta, a type of shooting sport from Finland
 Stratford station, London, UK, station code
 Superhuman Registration Act, a fictitious law in Marvel Comics
 Surveillance radar approach in aviation
 Solicitors Regulation Authority

Companies and organizations
 Samsung Research America, a subsidiary of Samsung Electronic
 Science Research Associates, US educational publisher
 Secretariat of Agrarian Reform, Mexico
 Sexual Recovery Anonymous, a sexual addiction program
 Skiff Racing Association
 Social Research Association, UK and Ireland
 Socialist Rifle Association, US
 Society for Risk Analysis
 Solicitors Regulation Authority. England and Wales
 SRA International, a US information technology firm
 California State Relief Administration, US New Deal agency
 Strategic Rail Authority, UK
 Student Radio Association
 Sustainable Restaurant Association, UK
 Swedish Road Administration